Caroline Jones (born June 30, 1990) is an American country music singer, songwriter and radio host. Jones has released a number of albums, the most successful one being Bare Feet. Her most recent album, Antipodes, was released on November 12, 2021. She became an official member of the Zac Brown Band in 2022.

Early life
Caroline Jones was born in New York City to Sonia and Paul Tudor Jones, and raised in Greenwich, Connecticut. She attended the Professional Children's School in New York City and later New York University where she studied creative writing. She took singing lessons when she was nine, and wrote her first song when she was ten. She learned to sing opera and jazz under Andy Anselmo, and she also learned how to play various instruments including piano, guitar, banjo, mandolin, harmonica, and Dobro. She was for some time more interested in pop, rock and R&B music until she visited Nashville when she was 16 or 17, and switched her interest to country music.

Career

In 2010, Jones launched The Heart is Smart initiative, which included performing in schools and colleges and providing music workshop for students. She also wrote and produced her debut album herself in New York City and Nashville in 2010, playing multiple instruments on the album. In January 2011, Jones self-released the album, Fallen Flower. She quickly followed with three albums the following year.
In 2013, Jones became the host of Art & Soul, a radio show on SiriusXM's Coffee House interviewing musicians on their music and songwriting.

In 2017, she opened for Zac Brown Band and in 2018 Jimmy Buffett. Through Buffett, she became signed to his Mailboat Records, and she also collaborated with Buffett on a song.

Jones was listed as one of the 10 need-to-know new country artists by Rolling Stone in 2017, and one of 15 country artists to watch by Billboard in 2018.
Jones released Bare Feet in March 2018. Jones wrote all the songs in the album, which was produced by Ric Wake. In 2019, she was listed among the 40 Under 40 List put out by Connecticut Magazine.

Jones' single, "Chasin' Me", entered the Mediabase country chart at number 50 for the week ending June 1, 2019.

In 2021, she release the album Antipodes.
In 2022, she joined Zac Brown Band as a member of the band. She had previously opened for the band on a number of tours since 2017, as well as appearing as a guest performer in other tours.

Discography

Studio albums

Extended plays

Singles

Music videos

Tours
Supporting
Welcome Home Tour 
Down the Rabbit Hole Live 
The Owl Tour

References

External links
Caroline Jones

1990 births
American women country singers
American country singer-songwriters
21st-century American singers
Living people
21st-century American women singers
Zac Brown Band members